Ateny is the name for Athens in several Slavic languages.

It may also refer to:
Ateny, Podlaskie Voivodeship, Poland
Kraków, the Polish Athens (Polskie Ateny)
Nowe Ateny, the first Polish-language encyclopedia